Vladimir Baños Chacón (Guayacón)  (born January 17, 1983) is a Cuban professional baseball pitcher with the Padule Baseball Club of the Italian Baseball League. 

Baños played for the Cuba national baseball team at the 2006 Intercontinental Cup, 2007 World Port Tournament, 2007 Baseball World Cup, 2013 World Port Tournament and 2017 World Baseball Classic.

On January 24, 2018, Baños signed with the Padule Baseball Club of the Italian Baseball League for the 2018 season.

References

External links

1983 births
Living people
Cuban baseball players
Baseball pitchers
Vegueros de Pinar del Rio players
Tigres de Ciego de Avila players
2017 World Baseball Classic players
People from Pinar del Río